Henuttaneb was an Ancient Egyptian princess of the Eighteenth Dynasty and daughter of pharaoh Amenhotep III and his Great Royal Wife, Queen Tiye.

Family
Henuttaneb was one of the daughters of ancient Egyptian Pharaoh Amenhotep III of the 18th Dynasty and his Great Royal Wife, Queen Tiye. She was a sister of Pharaoh Akhenaten. She also had several more siblings – one other brother and several sisters. 

Henuttaneb's name means Lady of All Lands and was also frequently used as a title for queens. She was the third daughter of her parents (after Sitamun and Isis, also called Iset).

Biography
Henuttaneb is shown on a colossal statue from Medinet Habu. This huge  sculpture shows Amenhotep III and Tiye seated side by side, "with three of their daughters standing in front of the throne--Henuttaneb, the largest and best preserved, in the centre; Nebetah on the right; and another, whose name is destroyed, on the left". She also appears in the temple at Soleb and on a carnelian plaque (with her sister Iset, before their parents). Her name appears on three faience fragments.

It is unclear whether Henuttaneb was elevated to the rank of queen like Sitamun and Iset. She is nowhere mentioned as King's Wife, but on the aforementioned carnelian plaque her name is enclosed in a cartouche, a privilege which only kings and their wives were entitled to.

After the death of her father she is not mentioned again.

References

14th-century BC Egyptian women
Princesses of the Eighteenth Dynasty of Egypt
Children of Amenhotep III